Ivan Asen Point (‘Nos Ivan Asen’ \'nos i-'van a-'sen\) is a narrow rocky point projecting 680 m into Osmar Strait from the southeast coast of Smith Island in the South Shetland Islands, Antarctica.  It forms the southwest side of the entrance to Ivan Asen Cove and the northeast side of the entrance to Yarebitsa Cove, and separates the glacier termini of Dragoman Glacier to the north and Armira Glacier to the south.

The point is named after Czar Ivan Asen II of Bulgaria, 1218-1241 AD.

Location

See also
 Smith Island
 List of Bulgarian toponyms in Antarctica

Maps
Chart of South Shetland including Coronation Island, &c. from the exploration of the sloop Dove in the years 1821 and 1822 by George Powell Commander of the same. Scale ca. 1:200000. London: Laurie, 1822.
  L.L. Ivanov. Antarctica: Livingston Island and Greenwich, Robert, Snow and Smith Islands. Scale 1:120000 topographic map. Troyan: Manfred Wörner Foundation, 2010.  (First edition 2009. )
 South Shetland Islands: Smith and Low Islands. Scale 1:150000 topographic map No. 13677. British Antarctic Survey, 2009.
 Antarctic Digital Database (ADD). Scale 1:250000 topographic map of Antarctica. Scientific Committee on Antarctic Research (SCAR). Since 1993, regularly upgraded and updated.
 L.L. Ivanov. Antarctica: Livingston Island and Smith Island. Scale 1:100000 topographic map. Manfred Wörner Foundation, 2017.

References
 Ivan Asen Point. SCAR Composite Antarctic Gazetteer
 Bulgarian Antarctic Gazetteer. Antarctic Place-names Commission. (details in Bulgarian, basic data in English)

External links
 Ivan Asen Point. Copernix satellite image

Bulgaria and the Antarctic
Headlands of Smith Island (South Shetland Islands)